Neufahrn bei Freising is a municipality in the district of Freising, in Bavaria, Germany. It has about 20,000 inhabitants and is located near the river Isar, 12 km southwest of Freising and 20 km northeast of Munich.

It is a stop on the Munich–Regensburg line and is served by S1 trains, running from Munich to Freising.

References

Gallery

External links
 
  

Freising (district)